Julien Sanchez (born 19 October 1983 in Argenteuil) is a French politician.

A member of the National Front since 2000, he has been its spokesperson since 2017. He is also mayor of Beaucaire (Gard) and president of the Rassemblement national group at the Regional council of Occitanie.

Biography 
Julien Sanchez was born on 19 October 1983 in Argenteuil, Val-d'Oise.

He joined the National Front in 2000, at the age of 16.

In the 2014 municipal election in Beaucaire, the list he is leading leads the second round in a quadrangular format, with 39.8% of the votes.

References
 This article is a translation of the French article titled Julien Sanchez

1983 births
Living people
National Rally (France) politicians
People from Argenteuil
French people of Spanish descent
University of Montpellier alumni
Mayors of places in Occitania (administrative region)